Jonah Placid (born 14 May 1995) is an Australian rugby union player who currently plays as a fullback for the  in Super Rugby. Domestically, he plays for Easts in the Queensland Premier Rugby tournament.

Career

Born in New South Wales, but raised in Rockhampton, Queensland, Placid first came to prominence playing for Easts Tigers and he helped them win the 2013 Queensland Premier Rugby Title. This saw him named in the Queensland Reds wider training squad for the 2014 Super Rugby season. Although this was largely a development contract and he seemed unlikely to be given any game time during the campaign, an injury crisis saw him make his Super Rugby debut as a second-half replacement against the Western Force on 5 April 2014. It was to prove an unhappy debut as his side went down to 32-29 defeat and he himself had to be substituted with a chest injury following a heavy collision with Force fullback Jayden Hayward. He is currently playing for Wests Scarborough in the Fortescue Premier Grade.

International

Placid played a starring role for the Australian Schoolboys during their successful 2012 season. This included playing a part in his team´s historic victory away to New Zealand, only the second time they´d ever won on the other side of the Tasman. As a reward he was selected for the Australia Under-20 side which competed in the 2013 IRB Junior World Championship in France.

Super Rugby statistics

References

1995 births
Australian rugby union players
Rugby union fullbacks
Queensland Reds players
Melbourne Rebels players
Melbourne Rising players
Sportspeople from Rockhampton
Living people
Australian expatriate rugby union players
Expatriate rugby union players in France
RC Toulonnais players
Western Force players
Rugby union wings
Rugby union players from New South Wales